Muizenberg (Dutch for "mice mountain") is a beach-side town in the Western Cape, South Africa. It is situated where the shore of the Cape Peninsula curves round to the east on the False Bay coast. It is considered to be the main surfing spot in Cape Town and is currently home to a surfing community, centered on the popular 'Surfer's Corner'.

History

Muizenberg was apparently named after Wynand Willem Muijs who commanded a small outpost on the shore of Zandvlei in 1743.

The Battle of Muizenberg was a small but significant military affair that began on 7 August 1795 and ended three months later with the (first) British occupation of the Cape. Thus began the period (briefly interrupted from 1803 to 1806) of British control of the Cape, and subsequently much of Southern Africa. The historical remnant of the Battle of Muizenberg is a site on the hillside overlooking False Bay that holds the remains of a defensive fort started by the Dutch in 1795 and expanded by the British from 1796 onwards. Cannons from that era are mounted at "Het Posthuys", the Muizenberg Park and on the station platform.

The railway from Cape Town, which for twenty years stopped at Wynberg, was extended to Muizenberg in 1882. Muizenberg started as a place for holiday homes for the rich after the discovery of gold in the Witwatersrand in 1886. Muizenberg Municipality was established in 1895. It merged with Kalk Bay in 1897. In 1910 a library opened next to the Natale Labia, and a year later a post office opened. In 1911 the first pavilion, a wooden one, was built.

Buildings
The famous architect, Sir Herbert Baker, designed his house "Sand Hills" on Atlantic Road, was the architect for "Vergenoegd" further along the same road, and designed "Coel an Mar" on Main Rd.

Many of the buildings in Muizenberg date from the resort town's heyday and are built in the art deco style.  At its peak the Muizenberg beachfront attracted masses of holiday-makers and the beach in front of the pavilion earned the name "The Snake Pit".  It boasted a large Jewish population that attended the synagogue in Camp Rd.  The community is celebrated in a book called "The Stetl by the Sea".

Rhodes Cottage
Rhodes' Cottage is a small house on the seafront that Cecil Rhodes bought as a holiday cottage and this was where he died in 1902. The house is preserved as a museum dedicated to Rhodes' life and is open to the public.

Het Posthuys
Het Posthuys is one of the oldest buildings in South Africa, originally erected in February 1673: a year before the Castle in Cape Town was occupied. It was built by the Dutch East India Company (Vereenigde Oost-Indische Compagnie or VOC), originally as a three-roomed signal station, and used as a military observation post, and subsequently used as a toll-house to levy a tax on farmers passing by to sell their produce to ships lying in Simon's Bay. One of the early postholders was Sergeant Muys (meaning "mouse"), from whom Muizenberg (formerly Muysenbergh and Muys Zijn Bergh (Muys' mountain) before that) gets its name. After a varied career as a police station, stables, brothel, hotel and private house the building was identified for what it was in the 1980s and restored with funds from Anglo American Corporation. The house is cared for by the Muizenberg Historical Conservation Society and contains a small collection of photos and items of interest relating to early days in Muizenberg. It is open to the public.

Casa Labia
The Muizenberg Battle site flanks the home of the first Italian Envoy Extraordinary and Minister Plenipotentiary to South Africa, Prince Natale Labia.  Originally called "The Fort" after the site of the battle, it now bears the name Casa Labia and is a restaurant, conference centre and music venue. The house was built by skilled Italian artisans and houses part of the Labia family's extensive art collection.

Behind Casa Labia lies the grave site of Abe Bailey, one of South Africa's early and important mine magnates.  The graveyard is maintained by the Muizenberg Historical Conservation Society. One of the few houses on the sea side of the railway line, is the thatched cottage owned by Bailey and called Bailey's Cottage.  This is owned by the South African Navy.

Pavilion
There have been three pavilions built in Muizenberg - the first was a wooden one built in 1911. The next had bathing cubicles, a tearoom, and a 900-seat theatre, built in 1929. This was demolished in 1970, and a third one, still standing, was built.

Present day

Muizenberg has a fine, long beach that in effect stretches all the way round the top of False Bay to the Strand, a distance of over 20 km. False Bay, known for its population of White Sharks, also has a shark watch service that operates from Muizenberg, signalling alerts when sharks come in proximity of bathers at the main beach and surfers at Surfer's Corner. Above Muizenberg there is a line of steep cliffs that is very popular as a venue for rock climbing. However, certain parts of the cliff are off-limits to climbers when birds nest on the ledges.

The Zandvlei estuary enters the ocean in Muizenberg. The estuary is one of the most important estuaries for fish spawning on the coastline and is home to the Imperial Yacht Club and Peninsula Canoe Club.

Educational establishments
Muizenberg houses one of the False Bay College campuses in the Cinnabar Building, a high-rise apartment tower. The college, a Public Further Education and Training Institution (FET), was established in September 2002 when the South Peninsula College (established 1970) and the Westlake College (established 1954) were merged.  Muizenberg is also home to the African Institute for Mathematical Sciences (AIMS), a pan-African centre for education and research in mathematical sciences.

Beach front
Muizenberg is home to the well known "Surfers Corner", there is a range of restaurants and coffee shops in the area such as Knead Bakery, Bootlegger, Kauai and Starbucks. Surf shops are also very present in the area.

Agatha Christie, famous author and playwright, wrote that after nursing duty she would daily take the train to Muizenberg to go surfing.

Geography 

The older and central part of Muizenberg also known as “Muizenberg Village” lies on the foot slopes of the Muizenberg Mountain whilst the newer and eastern part of Muizenberg lies on the flat expanse of land (known as the Cape Flats) bordering the lake of Zandvlei. 

Muizenberg is located approximately 27 km south-east of Cape Town by road, with its greater area being bordered by Kalk Bay to the south-west, the city of Cape Town to the north and Grassy Park to the north-west.

Transport

Rail 

Greater Muizenberg consists of four railway stations: Lakeside and False Bay, both to the north of Muizenberg, Muizenberg Railway Station in the CBD and St James, to the south of Muizenberg. Muizenberg lies on the Southern Line of the Metrorail Western Cape commuter rail system which links the coastal town to Cape Town in the north and Kalk Bay, Fish Hoek and Simon’s Town in the south-west.

Roads 
Muizenberg is accessed by several routes within Greater Cape Town including the following:
 The R310 (Atlantic Road/Baden Powell Drive) is a regional route which starts at the intersection with the M4 in the CBD and runs along the coast linking to Mitchells Plain and Khayelitsha before diverting inland towards Stellenbosch.
 The M3 (Simon can see Stel Freeway) is a metropolitan freeway that has an indirect linkage with Muizenberg beginning at the intersection with the M42 in Westlake, just north of Muizenberg and runs northwards towards Constantia and Cape Town. 
 The M4 (Main Road) is a metropolitan route which runs from Cape Town in the north-east to pass through the CBD  and continue towards Fish Hoek and Simon’s Town in the south-east 
 The M5 (Prince George Drive) is a metropolitan route/freeway which begins at the traffic circle with the R310 in the east of Muizenberg and runs northward towards Cape Town and Milnerton. 
 The M75 (Boyes Drive) which starts at the intersection with the M4 in Lakeside and runs above Muizenberg along the lower slopes of the mountains of the Cape Peninsula to end with the M4 again in Kalk Bay.

Nearby places of interest
Zandvlei Estuary Nature Reserve
Rondevlei Nature Reserve
Kalk Bay Harbour
Peck's Valley
Table Mountain Nature Reserve above Boyes Drive

References

Gallery

Suburbs of Cape Town
Surfing locations in South Africa
Longest beaches